The Lake Bailey–Roosevelt Lake Historic District encompasses a landscape and buildings developed by the Civilian Conservation Corps in Petit Jean State Park, Conway County, Arkansas.  The district includes both Lake Bailey and Roosevelt Lake, man-made by CCC-built dams, along with the waterfall between the two, as well as a boathouse, shelter and bathhouse, and the Cedar Creek Bridge, which crosses Roosevelt Lake at its outlet.  A unique artistic feature built by the CCC are a series of what appear to be wooden stumps poking out of Roosevelt Lake, which are actually built out of concrete.  These facilities were built about 1935, and form a subset of park's surviving CCC architecture.

The district was listed on the National Register of Historic Places in 1992.

See also
National Register of Historic Places listings in Conway County, Arkansas

References

Historic districts on the National Register of Historic Places in Arkansas
National Register of Historic Places in Conway County, Arkansas
Buildings and structures completed in 1935
Civilian Conservation Corps in Arkansas
Rustic architecture in Arkansas
Parks on the National Register of Historic Places in Arkansas